The following is a partial list of sports clubs in Adelaide, the capital of South Australia.

Athletics
Adelaide University Athletics Club
Adelaide Eagles Little Athletics Club
Flinders Athletics Club

Australian rules football

Australian Football League (AFL)
Adelaide Crows
Port Adelaide Football Club

South Australian National Football League (SANFL)
Central District Bulldogs
Glenelg Football Club
North Adelaide Roosters
Norwood Football Club
Port Adelaide Football Club 
South Adelaide Football Club
Sturt Football Club
West Adelaide Football Club
Woodville-West Torrens Football Club

Adelaide Footy League
Adelaide University Football Club
Broadview Football Club
Gepps Cross Football Club
Henley Football Club
Modbury Football Club
Port District Football Club
Salisbury North
GAZA, Premiers 2011
Goodwood Saints
Edwardstown Football Club
Smithfield Football Club
Portland Football Club
Rosewater Football Club
Golden Grove Football Club
Kenilworth Football Club
Unley Jets Football Club
Plympton Football Club
Prince Alfred Old Collegians Football Club
Sacred Heart Old Collegians Football Club
PHOS Camden Football Club
North Haven Football Club
Kilburn Football Club
Brighton Football Club
Marion Football Club

Badminton
Glenelg Badminton Club
Ranges Badminton Club
PAOC Badminton Club
Sturt Badminton Club

Baseball
Adelaide Bite (Australian Baseball League)

South Australian Baseball League
Adelaide Baseball Club
 Adelaide University Baseball Club
East Torrens Baseball Club
Glenelg Baseball Club
Golden Grove Central Districts Baseball Club
Goodwood Baseball Club
Henley & Grange Baseball Club
Kensington Baseball Club
Northern Districts Baseball Club
Playford City Baseball Club
Port Adelaide Baseball Club
Southern Districts Baseball Club
Sturt Baseball Club
West Torrens Baseball Club
Woodville District Baseball Club

Basketball
Adelaide Lightning (Women's National Basketball League)
Adelaide 36ers (National Basketball League)
South Australian Defence Basketball (Australian Defence Basketball Association)

NBL1 Central Division
Central District Lions
Eastern Mavericks
Norwood Flames
North Adelaide Rockets
Forrestville Eagles
Sturt Sabres
Southern Tigers
West Adelaide Bearcats
South Adelaide Panthers
Woodville Warriors

Other District (Central Division) Basketball Clubs 
UniSA Basketball
University of Adelaide
Western Magic
Torrens Valley Cougars

Cricket
Adelaide Strikers (Big Bash League), (Women's Big Bash League)
West End Redbacks (Sheffield Shield, Marsh One Day Cup)
South Australian Scorpions (Women's National Cricket League)

South Australian Grade Cricket League (SACA)
Adelaide Cricket Club
Adelaide University Cricket Club
East Torrens Cricket Club
Glenelg Cricket Club
Kensington Cricket Club
Northern Districts Cricket Club
Port Adelaide Cricket Club
Prospect Cricket Club
Southern Districts Cricket Club
Sturt Cricket Club
Tea Tree Gully Cricket Club
West Torrens Cricket Club
Woodville Cricket Club

Soccer
Adelaide United FC (A-League, W-League football (soccer))
Adelaide City (FFSA Super League)
Croydon Kings (FFSA Super League)
Cumberland United Womens FC (FFSA Women's Premier League )
Cumberland United FC (FFSA Premier League )
West Adelaide (FFSA State League)
Port Adelaide Lion Soccer Club (The Pirates) (FFSA Premier League, football (soccer))

Dragon Boating 
 Adelaide Phoenix Dragon Boat Club

Fishing
Adelaide Game Fishing Club
Game Fishing Club of South Australia
Western Districts Angling Club

Golf
Royal Adelaide Golf Club
Glenelg Golf Club

Hockey
 Adelaide hockey club
 Adelaide University Hockey Club
 Burnside Hockey Club
 Forestville hockey club
 Grange Royals Hockey Club
 Enfield Hockey Club
 North East Hockey Club
 Port Adelaide District Hockey Club
 Seacliff Hockey Club
 St. Peters Old Collegians Hockey Club
 University of South Australia Hockey Club
 Woodville Hockey Club

Horse racing
South Australian Jockey Club

Ice hockey
Adelaide Adrenaline
Adelaide Rush
Adelaide Generals

Gridiron

 Adelaide University Razorbacks
 South City Chiefs
 Port Adelaide Spartans
 UniSA Eagles
 Southern District Oilers

Netball

National level
Suncorp Super Netball
 Adelaide Thunderbirds
Australian Netball League
 Southern Force

State level
Netball South Australia Premier League

Rowing
Adelaide Rowing Club
Adelaide University Boat Club
 Riverside Rowing Club
 Torrens Rowing Club

Rugby league

National Rugby League
Adelaide Rams

South Australian Rugby League

SARL Clubs
Central Districts Roosters
Cougars
Para Districts Eels
Henley Raiders
Northern Districts Dragons
River City Knights
South Adelaide Bulldogs
Spencer Gulf Titans
Glenelg Tigers

Rugby union

South Australian Rugby Union

SA Club Rugby
 Adelaide University Rugby Union Football Club
 Barossa Rams RC                 Joe Crouch Former England Under 17s 
 Brighton RUFC
 Burnside RUFC
 Elizabeth RUFC                  Joe Crouch Former England Under 17s 
 North East Districts RUFC
 North Torrens RUFC
 Old Collegians Rugby Club
 Onkaparinga RUFC
 Port Adelaide RUFC
 Souths Suburbs RUFC
 Woodville RUFC

Korfball
North Adelaide Korfball Club
Adelaide Boomers Korfball Club
Glenelg Korfball Club
Arista Marion Korfball Club
Flinders University Korfball Club

See also

Sport in South Australia

References

Adelaide
 
Adelaide-related lists
Adelaide